Jiří Barta (born 26 November 1948) is a Czech stop-motion animation director. Many of his films use wood as a medium for animation. Among his notable films are the 1986 film The Pied Piper.

In 2007 he released his first computer-animated short film named Domečku, vař animated in a studio of Alkay Animation and in 2009 he released a new puppet-animated feature film, Toys in the Attic.

Biography
Jiří Barta was born in Prague. In 1969 he began studying film and TV graphics at the Academy of Arts, Architecture and Design in Prague. He made the first animated film in 1978 with Jiří Trnka's studio.

At the Academy of Arts, Architecture and Design in Prague he leads the Film and TV Graphics Studio. He was appointed as Associate Professor in 1993 and Professor in 2001. In addition to teaching, he collaborates with theater and film projects.

Filmography
Feature films
The Pied Piper (Krysař, 1986)
Toys in the Attic (Na půdě aneb Kdo má dneska narozeniny?, 2009)
The Golem (TBA)

Short films
Riddles for a Candy (Hádanky za bonbón, 1978)
The Design (Projekt, 1981)
Disc Jockey (Diskžokej, 1981)
The Vanished World of Gloves (Zaniklý svět rukavic, 1982)
A Ballad About Green Wood (Balada o zeleném dřevu, 1983)
The Last Theft (Poslední lup, 1987)
The Club of the Laid Off (Klub odložených, 1989)
Golem (1993)
Cook, Mug, Cook! (Domečku, vař!, 2007)
Yuki Onna (2013)

References

External links

Interview with Barta concerning The Golem
Overview of The Pied Piper of Hameln
Collection of clips from his films (also the "trailer" for The Golem)
Official site for "In the Attic"
Production company site for "In the Attic"
Variety review of "In the Attic"
Information about The pied piper:https://revistasonda.upv.es/portfolio/la-poesia-en-movimiento-en-krysar-de-jiri-barta-1985-el-cine-de-animacion-stop-motion-checo-como-confluencia-del-expresionismo-filmico-y-el-teatro-de-marionetas/

1948 births
Living people
Film directors from Prague
Czech animators
Czech puppeteers
Czech animated film directors
Stop motion animators
Academy of Arts, Architecture and Design in Prague alumni
Academic staff of the Academy of Arts, Architecture and Design in Prague